The minister of environment and climate change is a minister of the Crown in the Cabinet of Canada. The portfolio is responsible for the Environment and Climate Change Canada, as well as a number of other federal organizations including Parks Canada, and the Impact Assessment Agency of Canada.

Steven Guilbeault is the current minister of environment and climate change. He was appointed to the role on October 26, 2021.

The position was called the minister of the environment until 2015, when the position was given its current name upon the creation of Justin Trudeau’s cabinet, the 29th Canadian ministry.

List of ministers
Key:

See also
International list of ministers of the environment

Notes

Environment
Canada